Aníbal José Chávez Frías (January 9, 1957 – July 17, 2016) was a Venezuelan politician. He was the mayor of Sabaneta, Barinas, and the younger brother of former President Hugo Chávez and governor Adán Chávez. Chávez was born in 1957, the third son of Hugo de los Reyes Chávez and Elena Frías de Chávez.

Mayor of Sabaneta
Aníbal was the mayor of Sabaneta, a city in Venezuela's Barinas State. Sabaneta is the capital city of Alberto Arvelo Torrealba municipality in Barines. The city was founded by Juan de Alhama in 1787. The principal industry is sugar production.

Family
Aníbal was a member of the Chávez political family. His father is Hugo de los Reyes Chávez (a former state governor). Two of his brothers were also politicians: Hugo Chávez, who was President of Venezuela from 1999 until his death in 2013, and Adán Chávez, Governor of Barinas.

References

1957 births
2016 deaths
People from Barinas (state)
Chávez family
Mayors of places in Venezuela
Death in Caracas